Hwang Min-hyun (born August 9, 1995), known mononymously as Minhyun, is a South Korean singer, songwriter and actor. He began his professional career in 2012 as a lead vocalist of the South Korean boy group NU'EST. In 2017, he participated in second season of Produce 101 and finished ninth place, becoming a member of Wanna One. Following Wanna One's disbandment, Hwang re-joined NU'EST, remaining in the group until its disbandment in 2022. He is currently a solo artist and actor signed under Pledis Entertainment.

Career

Pre-debut
Hwang was scouted by South Korean entertainment agency Pledis Entertainment at the age of fifteen and became a trainee for almost two years. Prior to his debut, he became more well known after appearing in Orange Caramel's music video for their single "Shanghai Romance". He also made appearances in labelmates' music releases as a member of 'Pledis Boys'.

2012–2016: NU'EST

On 15 March 2012, Hwang debuted as a member of NU'EST.

He also appeared at the 2012–13 Seoul Fashion Week as a model for designer Park Yoon-soo's fashion show 'Big Park'.

In 2015, Hwang was featured in indie artist Fromm's new track, "Aftermath". In 2016, Pledis Entertainment released Minhyun and JR's music video for "Daybreak", which is part of NU'EST's fifth mini album Canvas.

2017–2018: Produce 101 and Wanna One

In 2017, NU'EST halted all promotions while JR, Baekho, Minhyun, and Ren participated in the second season of the series Produce 101.

In the third episode of the series, Hwang picked the members for 'Sorry Sorry Team 2', for which he was nicknamed 'producer' and 'CEO Hwang' by online commenters. In the "Position" challenge, he covered I.O.I's "Downpour" and the view count of his fancam reached 1 million within three days. In the "Concept" challenge, he was the center of "Never" team, which charted at number one in multiple music charts. At the end of the program, he ranked 9th, becoming one of the final 11 members to debut in Wanna One. In accordance with the series’ contract, he promoted exclusively as a member of Wanna One for the duration of the group's contract of 1.5 years.

2019–2022: Return to NU'EST, solo projects and Wanna One reunion stage
While his Wanna One contract officially ended on December 31, 2018, Hwang did not officially return to NU'EST until the end of January 2019. This was due to Pledis and Swing Entertainment coming to an agreement that allowed him to attend scheduled year-end shows and award ceremonies throughout January 2019 as a member of Wanna One. His final Wanna One activity before returning to NU'EST was a final concert (titled Therefore) that was held across four days, ending on January 27, 2019.

He, along with the rest of NU'EST, announced their contract renewal with Pledis Entertainment on February 1, 2019.

On March 15, Hwang participated in his first song since returning to NU'EST, a special digital single "A Song For You" to celebrate the seventh anniversary of their debut.

On April 3, he released a digital solo single "Universe" as the pre-release single from the group's first comeback since 2016, Happily Ever After. The single is accompanied by the music video shot in Budapest and Milan. Later in the year, Hwang made his musical theater debut as Count Axel von Fersen in the Seoul revival of the musical Marie Antoinette, which ran from August until November 2019.

On June 26, 2020, Hwang was cast in the lead role of Go Eun-taek in the JTBC drama Live On, which aired from November 2020 to January 2021.

A day after the release of NU'EST's second album Romanticize in April 2021, Pledis Entertainment announced that he was cast in the upcoming tvN drama Alchemy of Souls, written by the Hong Sisters.

After days of speculation, it was confirmed on November 15, 2021, that Hwang, alongside the other members of Wanna One (except for Lai Kuan-lin), will reunite for a special stage performance at the 2021 Mnet Asian Music Awards in December 2021. While CJ E&M announced that there are talks of a Wanna One reunion concert and subsequent albums, Pledis Entertainment clarified that Hwang will perform with Wanna One only at the 2021 Mnet Asian Music Awards and will return to NU'EST and his solo projects afterward.

On December 5, 2021, Hwang released the single "I'll Be With You Every Day" (모든 날을 너와 함께 할게), his first solo original soundtrack, for the MBC series The Red Sleeve.

It was announced on February 28, 2022 that NU'EST's exclusive contract with Pledis Entertainment will expire on March 14, 2022 and that Hwang and Baekho have renewed their contracts with the agency while members Aron, JR and Ren chose not to.

On March 24, 2022, Hwang confirmed a four-year contract extension with Italian luxury brand Moncler.

2023–present: Solo debut
On January 20, 2023, Pledis confirmed that Hwang would make his solo debut in February. It was announced on February 6, 2023, that Hwang would release his first mini-album titled Truth or Lie on February 27.

Discography

Extended plays

Singles

Soundtrack appearances

Filmography

Films

Television series

Television show

Hosting

Musical theatre

Awards and nominations

Notes

References

External links

1995 births
Living people
People from Busan
Pledis Entertainment artists
Produce 101 contestants
School of Performing Arts Seoul alumni
South Korean male singers
South Korean male idols
South Korean pop singers
South Korean male film actors
South Korean male television actors
Swing Entertainment artists
21st-century South Korean singers
21st-century South Korean male actors
Wanna One members
Reality show winners
Hybe Corporation artists